Irena Tomašovičová (born 12 November 1964) is a Slovak handball player. She competed in the women's tournament at the 1988 Summer Olympics.

References

1964 births
Living people
Slovak female handball players
Olympic handball players of Czechoslovakia
Handball players at the 1988 Summer Olympics
People from Čadca District
Sportspeople from the Žilina Region